D. J. Turner (born January 18, 1997) is an American football wide receiver for the Las Vegas Raiders of the National Football League (NFL). He played college football at Maryland and Pittsburgh.

College career
Turner played college football at the University of Maryland, College Park for four years before transferring to the University of Pittsburgh for his final year. During his career, he had 68 receptions for 928 yards and four touchdowns.

Professional career

Turner signed with the Las Vegas Raiders as an undrafted free agent in 2021. After spending his first season on the practice squad, he made the teams 53-man roster in 2022. On September 14, 2022, Turner was placed on injured reserve list. He was activated on October 22. He was waived on December 17 and re-signed to practice squad three days later. He signed a reserve/future contract on January 9, 2023.

References

External links
Las Vegas Raiders bio

1997 births
Living people
Players of American football from Maryland
American football wide receivers
Maryland Terrapins football players
Pittsburgh Panthers football players
Las Vegas Raiders players